The 1947 Cornell Big Red football team was an American football team that represented Cornell University during the 1947 college football season.  In its first season under head coach George K. James, the team compiled a 4–5 record and was outscored by a total of 161 to 126.

Schedule

References

Cornell
Cornell Big Red football seasons
Cornell Big Red football